The Truth About Love is the third studio album by English singer Lemar. It was released by RCA Records on 11 September 2006 and contains the singles "It's Not That Easy", "Tick Tock", and "Someone Should Tell You." The album peaked at number three on the UK Albums Chart, becoming Lemar's highest-charting album to date and his first to make the top 5. The Truth About Love was certified Gold by the British Phonographic Industry (BPI) on 15 September 2006, after only five days of it being on sale. It was later awarded Platinum on 8 December 2006.

Critical reception
AllMusic editor Sharon Mawer rated the album three and a half stars out of five and noted that The Truth About Love quickly moves "into familiar smooth soul territory, R&B from the 2000s, and up-to-date doo wop."

Track listing

Charts

Weekly charts

Year-end charts

Certifications

References

2006 albums
Lemar albums
RCA Records albums
Albums produced by Brian Rawling